Henry R. Pease (1835–1907) was a U.S. Senator from Mississippi from 1874 to 1875; also serving in the South Dakota State Senate. Senator Pease may also refer to:

Calvin Pease (1776–1839), Ohio State Senate
Don Pease (1932–2002), Ohio State Senate
Edward A. Pease (born 1951), Indiana State Senate
Elisha M. Pease (1812–1883), Texas State Senate
Gerald Pease (born 1954), Montana State Senate